Tamika Y. Davis is a Jamaican politician and attorney-at-law who is a current sitting MP. She defeated Ian Hayles in Hanover Western at the 2020 general election.

Early life 
Davis hails from Middlesex County.

Education 
Davis attended the Middlesex Corner Primary School and then Montego Bay High School for Girls in St James before being transferred to Rusea’s High School. She graduated from the University of the West Indies

Electoral history

References 

Living people
Jamaican women lawyers
21st-century Jamaican politicians
21st-century Jamaican women politicians
University of the West Indies alumni
People from Hanover Parish
Members of the House of Representatives of Jamaica
Jamaica Labour Party politicians
Year of birth missing (living people)
21st-century Jamaican lawyers
Members of the 14th Parliament of Jamaica